In Old Kentucky is a 1935 American comedy film starring Will Rogers, Dorothy Wilson and Russell Hardie. Two feuding families decide to settle a dispute with a horse race. It was Rogers' last film and was released posthumously after he was killed in a plane crash on August 15, 1935. The picture's supporting cast features Bill "Bojangles" Robinson as Wash Jackson.

It was filmed on-location on two sites in Thousand Oaks, California: Deerwood Stock Farm and Borchard Ranch.

Cast
 Will Rogers as Steve Tapley
 Dorothy Wilson as Nancy Martingale
 Russell Hardie as Dr. Lee Andrews
 Charles Sellon as Ezra Martingale
 Louise Henry as Arlene Shattuck
 Esther Dale as Dolly Breckenridge
 Alan Dinehart as Slick Doherty
 Charles Richman as Pole Shattuck
 Etienne Girardot as Pluvius J. Aspinwall
 John Ince as Sheriff
 Bill Robinson as Wash Jackson
 Greyboy the Horse as Greyboy

References

External links

American sports comedy films
American black-and-white films
American films based on plays
Films directed by George Marshall
American horse racing films
1930s sports comedy films
20th Century Fox films
Fox Film films
Films scored by Arthur Lange
Films shot in Ventura County, California
1930s American films